Ultraman, also known as the , is the collective name for all media produced by Tsuburaya Productions featuring Ultraman, his many brethren, and the myriad monsters. Debuting with Ultra Q and then Ultraman in 1966, created by special effects director Eiji Tsuburaya, the series is one of the most prominent tokusatsu superhero genre productions from Japan, along with the Toei-produced series Kamen Rider, Super Sentai and the Metal Heroes. The series is also one of the most well-known examples of the kaiju genre, along with Toho's Godzilla series and Daiei Film's Gamera series. However, the series also falls into the Kyodai Hero subgenre of tokusatsu, a subgenre it also helped popularise.

In Japan, the Ultraman brand generated  in merchandising revenue from 1966 to 1987, equivalent to more than  adjusted for inflation. Ultraman was the world's third top-selling licensed character in the 1980s, largely due to his popularity in Asia. References to Ultraman are abundant in Japanese pop culture, much like references to Superman in U.S. culture.

The Ultras

They had evolved into their current state of being following the activation of the Plasma Spark, which replaced their dead sun. Ultraman and his many kind are usually red-and-silver (although several color variations have been seen in recent years) and have glowing yellow almond-shaped dome eyes (although there are exceptions to both the shape and color) and various abilities, most notably firing energy beams from their crossed hands and flight.

The Ultras that are sent to other worlds are given Color Timers, or "warning lights", which blink with increasing frequency and turn from blue to red if an Ultra's energy supply dwindles or he is mortally wounded. Due to human pollution and the light filtering effects of the atmosphere, an Ultra can remain active on Earth for a limited span of minutes before their energy is depleted and they die. This forces an Ultra to either assume a human form or merge with a human host body. The latter process has healing properties that include reviving a recently dead person with their own life force.

Ultra beings also appear to be near-impossible to permanently kill, as several times an Ultra being has been killed, only to be revived by another member of their species. An Ultra being can be revived with a massive energy infusion, as when Mebius' allies revived him with their energy after his defeat by Alien Empera's army. Ultras always try to avoid battles in inhabited areas or near innocent bystanders, and try to minimize collateral property damage. If these concerns cannot be met, a city like Tokyo could be destroyed.

The Ultraman phenomenon
The show Ultraman was followed by many other series. Sequels to the original series are: Ultraseven (1967, TBS), The Return of Ultraman (1971, TBS), Ultraman Ace (1972, TBS), Ultraman Taro (1973, TBS), Ultraman Leo (1974, TBS), Ultraman 80 (1980, TBS), Ultraman Tiga (1996, MBS), Ultraman Dyna (1997, MBS), Ultraman Gaia (1998, MBS), and Ultraman Cosmos (2001, MBS). After that, the studio tried a reinvention of the hero through the "Ultra N Project", which involved three heroes: Ultraman Noa (the "mascot" of the Ultra N Project, who appears in stage shows as well as in the final episode of Ultraman Nexus) in late 2003, Ultraman Nexus (2004, CBC), and ULTRAMAN (2004, Shochiku Productions). This was followed by a return to the old-school series' style in the form of Ultraman Max (2005, CBC). In the course of the Max series, another new hero known as Ultraman Xenon was also introduced. April 2006 saw the 40th anniversary series, Ultraman Mebius, which signaled a long-awaited return to the original universe. Another hero was also introduced: Ultraman Hikari, formerly known as Hunter Knight Tsurugi.

The franchise has also had Ultras introduced in movie theaters, starting with Ultraman Zearth and Ultraman Zearth 2 in 1996 and 1997 respectively, as well as ULTRAMAN in 2004.

Foreign productions include the 1987 Hanna-Barbera co-production Ultraman: The Adventure Begins (in Japanese, Ultraman USA), an animated movie; Ultraman: Towards the Future (in Japanese, Ultraman Great), produced in Australia in 1990 and Ultraman: The Ultimate Hero (in Japanese, Ultraman Powered), produced in the United States in 1993. The Ultraman series have also been dubbed into various languages, including English (Ultraman, Ultraseven, Ultraman Tiga and Ultraman Max), Spanish (Ultraman, Ultraseven, Return of Ultraman, Ultraman Great and Ultraman Tiga), Portuguese  (Ultraman, Ultraseven, Return of Ultraman and Ultraman Tiga), French (only Ultraman). Also of note is the American English dub of Ultraman Tiga by 4Kids Entertainment that aired in 2002. The dub considerably distorted the characterization and general mood of the series, and it achieved only limited success.

In 1993, Tsuburaya Productions and Toei Company co-produced Ultraman vs. Kamen Rider, a crossover with the original Ultraman and Toei's Kamen Rider. This direct-to-video feature is co-copyrighted by both Toei (and its subordinates, Toei Video and Ishinomori Productions) and Tsuburaya Productions.

, Tsuburaya Productions accepts 36 Ultramen as official (counting Ultraman Legend, the combined form of Ultramen Cosmos and Justice, as a separate entity). This figure does not account for Thai-produced Ultramen (the figure is 38 if Next, Noa, and Nexus are counted as separate entities — it has been revealed in Nexus that all three are a single being with various modes used by different hosts). In 2013, the Ultra Series was cited in the Guinness Book of World Records as the record-holder for the most spin-off shows. The Ultraman brand generated $7.4 billion in merchandising revenue from 1966 to 1987, equivalent to more than  adjusted for inflation. Ultraman was the world's third top-selling licensed character in the 1980s, largely due to his popularity in Asia.

The Ultraman manga, which began in 2011, has sold more than 2.8million copies as of 2018. At the Tokyo Comic Con on 7 December 2017, Tsuburaya Productions revealed that an anime adaptation of the manga was planned for release in 2019. It was released by Netflix.

Ultraman content, products and services have been distributed in more than 100 countries worldwide,. Tsuburaya has officially made their Ultraman and non-Ultraman content widely available on their YouTube channel, even simulcasting several of their series with English subtitles, the channel has reached over 2 million subscribers. In China, an Ultraman television series received  views on over-the-top media services between July 2017 and March 2018.

The manga author Akira Toriyama, creator of Dragon Ball and Dr. Slump, cited Ultraman as a formative influence on his work. Peyton Reed, the director of the Ant-Man films in the Marvel Cinematic Universe, said that Ant-Man's costume design was influenced by Ultraman along with Inframan, another tokusatsu superhero from China. Video game designer Hideki Kamiya (known for games such as Resident Evil 2, Devil May Cry, Viewtiful Joe, Ōkami, Bayonetta and The Wonderful 101) said he loved Godzilla and Ultraman as a child.

It was announced in November 2019 that Marvel Comics has partnered with Tsuburaya Productions to publish Ultraman comic books in 2020. , Bandai Namco has sold  Ultraman soft figures (heroes and monsters) since 1983, while Bandai Namco Arts (including Bandai Visual) has sold  Ultraman home video units between January 1988 and March 2021.

Controversies

Licensing rights dispute

Ultraman's licensing rights outside Japan have been the subject of a prolonged legal dispute between Tsuburaya Productions and Chaiyo Productions (also called Tsuburaya Chaiyo Co. Ltd) based in Thailand. Tsuburaya had previously collaborated with Chaiyo on the production of two movies, The 6 Ultra Brothers vs. the Monster Army and Jumborg Ace & Giant—the latter of which featured another Tsuburaya superhero, Jumborg Ace—in 1974. Sompote Saengduenchai, founder/president of Chaiyo Productions, claimed and maintained that in 1976 that Noboru Tsuburaya, the son of the late Eiji Tsuburaya, had given him and his company a contract which had given him rights to everything Ultraman outside Japanese territories in exchange for a monetary loan.

In spite of the fact that the document failed to state clearly and specifically exactly what had been given to Tsuburaya in exchange for these rights, Japanese and Thai courts accepted this contract as real and binding because of the supposed hanko of the late Noboru Tsuburaya, who had died in 1995, in the document. Tsuburaya Productions insisted and maintained that the contract was a forgery (due to factual errors, including the faulty titles of the series in the document, such as Ultra Q being called Ultraman 1: Ultra Q, Ultraseven being called Ultraman 3: Ultraman Seven, and Tsuburaya Productions being called Tsuburaya Prod. and Enterprises, a name the company never did business under), and repeatedly contested the issue.

In the course of the legal battle, Sompote presented photos of himself sharing his photos of Thai Buddhist edifices, stating that Eiji had based Ultraman's face on those edifices, a claim which he has continued to hold since the dispute began. No other evidence supporting this claim is known to exist.

After an eight-year battle in the courts of both countries, Sompote Saengduenchai was awarded a favorable decision on 27 April 2004. The exact ruling fell into some dispute: Some said it only gave him merchandising rights for the first six Ultra Series (Ultra Q through Ultraman Taro) and Jumborg Ace outside Japan, and broadcasting rights of those shows within Thailand. Other accounts, usually reported in the Thai/Asian media, said that Chaiyo had gained the rights to those six shows everywhere outside Japan. The latter could be taken as Chaiyo's side of the story, as Tsuburaya was reported in the Japanese media to continue taking further action against them.

Tsuburaya decided not to market any of the disputed six Ultra Series outside Japan until it had completely settled the rights issues with Chaiyo, although the company continued to merchandise and distribute all of the Ultraman programs created after Ultraman Taro, including the theatrical feature Ultraman the Next, throughout the world. Because of the copyright struggle, importing literature on Ultraman into Singapore and Malaysia was prohibited. It also resulted in a slight backlash against Thai Ultraman fans, who were assumed to be outright Chaiyo supporters.

In 2005 the American company BCI Home Entertainment (BCI/Eclipse), a subsidiary of Navarre Corporation announced they had acquired the DVD license to Ultraman from distributor Golden Media Group Inc., a Hollywood-based distributor, who secured the rights from Tokyo-based UM Corp. Inc., acting as the global agent for Chaiyo. A three-disc box set containing the first 20 episodes of the series was released on 18 July 2006, followed by a second three-disc box set containing the remaining 19 episodes was released on 7 November 2006. Both sets feature the Japanese stereo audio, created by Tsuburaya Productions and Pioneer for their Japanese R-2 DVD release in 1999, as well as the English-dubbed version produced by United Artists for North American syndication. The original Japanese monaural was not included.

Unfortunately, the English audio for Episodes 5 through 39 were not all complete, as BCI sourced private home off-air audio recordings from an unknown television broadcast, which were cut to provide for more commercial time. Therefore, the episodes in question would switch to Japanese audio from English audio to cover the missing gaps. Due to these gaps, BCI's publicity department assumed the original series was edited by UA-TV when it was originally prepared for U.S. syndication. Only minor seconds of extreme violence were trimmed from three episodes, none of which contained dialogue. Tsuburaya Productions had a complete run of the UA-TV's version, which their Los Angeles office, UltraCom Inc., retrieved from a U.S. film warehouse in 1993. In 1994, they provided the English audio for the Expressions in Animation VHS release of the first four episodes, which were sourced for the corresponding episodes in the BCI release.

During the time of the legal battle, Chaiyo came up with three of their own Ultras: Ultraman Millennium, Dark Ultraman (an evil Ultra), and Ultraman Elite. These were not used for purposes other than stage shows and merchandise. Chaiyo also created a TV series that he called Project Ultraman, unaired as of late March 2008, a joint project in China featuring their own Ultraman and attaching Hong Kong star Ekin Cheng to the project.

On 23 August 2006, Tsuburaya Productions filed a new lawsuit against Chaiyo for copyright infringement and plagiarism (concerning their three original Ultraman characters), and the court case was taken to China. The Chinese courts in Beijing opened "The Ultraman Copyright Study Group" in response to the lawsuit. In April 2007, the Thailand Intellectual Property Court ruled in favor of Tsuburaya Productions, ordering Chaiyo to cease and desist making commercial profits from Chaiyo-produced Ultraman characters such as Millennium, Dark, and Elite. The defendants were also fined THB 15,000,000 (approx. JPY 50,904,959 or US$428,673.50 c. April 2007) plus interest and attorneys' fees. Project Ultraman went on hiatus as a result of the ruling, which implied that, although Chaiyo owned the right to some of the Ultraman series, it did not own the right to Ultraman and his brothers, including the design. Chaiyo gained permission to merchandise the original series, but lost the right to create and market its own Ultraman, or even use the original, without Tsuburaya's consent.

On 5 February 2008, Thailand's Supreme Court ruled in favor of Tsuburaya Productions of Japan after they made an appeal to the initial ruling. The ruling ended the long legal battle by finding Sompote Saengduenchai was not a co-creator of Ultraman. The decision ended Sompote's bid to continue his enterprise, and the court gave Sompote 30 days to stop profiteering from Ultraman. The final ruling saw Tsuburaya Productions as the sole copyright owner. Sompote was also required to pay THB 10,700,000 plus interest at the rate of 7.5 percent a year starting from 16 December 1997, when the original lawsuit was filed.

In 2009, the Thai Intellectual Property Court and the Tokyo District Court both ruled in favour of the Thai company. This led to the Tokyo District Court on 30 September 2010, ordering Tsuburaya Productions Co. of Japan to pay damages of 16.36 million yen (Bt5.9 million) to Sompote Saengduenchai of Thailand for violating his overseas copyrights on the Ultraman characters.

After the announcement of the film Dragon Force: So Long, Ultraman in July 2017, the dispute on the ownership of the franchise has escalated. But on 20 November 2017, through a Los Angeles court ruling by Judge Andre Birotte Jr, Tsuburaya won the lawsuit against Chaiyo and affiliate groups on the rights of the series after the jury concluded that the supposed agreement between Noboru Tsuburaya and Chaiyo was "not authentic". Despite UM Corporation and Chaiyo filing a counter-dispute, on 18 April 2018, the legal court came to a definite close where a final judgement states that the dispute and the document was deemed invalid, forbidding UMC to use the Ultra Series and all its related characters and forced them to pay Tsubaraya damages for its infringement of its rights.

With the release of the sequel film , issues between UMC, Bluearc and Tsubaraya had reignited and the company took legal actions against the two companies again. On 10 December 2019, it was confirmed by Tsuburaya that the court has rejected UMC and Bluearc's appeal for a retrial, stating the court's first verdict of regarding the rights and ownership of Ultraman to Tsuburaya is still legitimate and final, and that any future appeals by UMC and Bluearc will likely be rejected. As UMC and Bluearc failed to file a further appeal by 4 March 2020, they were to pay US$4,000,000 (approx. 400,000,000 Japanese yen) in compensatory damages, as well as other various court fees. The resulting victory has reached Thailand as well and the Thai Supreme Court ordered a ruling in favor Tsuburaya Productions as the legitimate copyright owner of the shows listed in the License Granting Agreement alongside ownership over Hanuman vs. 7 Ultraman (and its remake, Hanuman vs. 11 Ultraman) and Jumborg Ace & Giant. Sompote had made an appeal to the court over the decision, but was dismissed. Sompote believes the decision would affect the former two movies' status as national heritage items, and has appealed to both the Supreme Court and Ministry of Culture on that front.

Malaysian book ban
On 6 March 2014, the Malaysian Ministry of Home Affairs announced that it had banned the publication of an Ultraman comic book Ultraman: The Ultra Power "due to contents that were detrimental to public order". Social media users later noticed that a page in the book described the character of Ultraman King (from the film Mega Monster Battle: Ultra Galaxy) as a god, which in the Malaysian language is the Arabic word Allah. The Home Ministry later confirmed that the use of Allah was indeed the reason for the ban, claiming that the comparison may "confuse Muslim children and damage their faith". This highlighted the larger ban to prevent non-Muslims in Malaysia from using the word Allah, despite its common usage in Bahasa Melayu to refer to any god, as well as a suit from the Catholic Church of Malaysia over its usage.

Television

Series
 Ultraman (1966–1967)
 Ultraseven (1967–1968)
 Return of Ultraman (1971–1972)
 Ultraman Ace (1972–1973)
 Ultraman Taro (1973–1974)
 Ultraman Leo (1974–1975)
 The Ultraman (1979–1980)
 Ultraman 80 (1980–1981)
 Ultraman Tiga (1996–1997)
 Ultraman Dyna (1997–1998)
 Ultraman Gaia (1998–1999)
 Ultraman Neos (2000–2001)
 Ultraman Cosmos (2001–2002)
 Ultraman Nexus (2004–2005)
 Ultraman Max (2005–2006)
 Ultraman Mebius (2006–2007)
 Ultraseven X (October 2007–December 2007)
 Ultra Galaxy Mega Monster Battle (2007–2008)
 Ultra Galaxy Mega Monster Battle: Never Ending Odyssey (2008–2009)
 Ultraman Ginga (July 2013–December 2013)
 Ultraman Ginga S (July 2014–December 2014)
 Ultraman X (July 2015– December 2015)
 Ultraman Orb (July 2016–December 2016)
 Ultraman Geed (July 2017–December 2017)
 Ultraman R/B (July 2018–December 2018)
 Ultraman Taiga (July 2019–December 2019)
 Ultraman Z (June 2020–December 2020)
 Ultraman Trigger: New Generation Tiga (2021–2022)
 Ultraman Decker (2022-2023)

Films

 Ultraman: Monster Movie Feature (1967) 
 Ultraman, Ultraseven: Great Violent Monster Fight (1969) 
 Return of Ultraman (1971)
 Return of Ultraman: Fear of the Tornado Monsters (1971)
 Return of Ultraman: Jiro-Kun Rides a Monster (1972)
 Ultraman Taro (1973)
 Ultraman Taro: Burn On! The Six Ultra Brothers (1973)
 The 6 Ultra Brothers vs. the Monster Army (1974) 
 Ultraman Taro: The Blood-Sucking Flower Is a Young Girl's Spirit (1974)
 Ultraman (1979) 
 Ultraman: Great Monster Decisive Battle (1979)                                                  
 Ultraman Zoffy: Ultra Warriors vs. the Giant Monster Army (1984)
 Ultraman Story (1984)
 Ultraman: The Adventure Begins (1987) 
 Ultraman: Terror on Route 87 (1989)
 Ultraman Ace: Giant Ant Terrible-Monster vs. Ultra Brothers (1989)
 Ultraman Kids (1989)
 Ultra Q The Movie: Legend of the Stars (1990)                                                        
 Revive! Ultraman (1996) 
 Ultraman Company: This is the Ultraman (Wacky) Investigation Team (1996)
 Ultraman Zearth (1996)
 Ultraman Zearth 2: Superman Big Battle - Light and Shadow (1997)
 Ultraman Tiga & Ultraman Dyna: Warriors of the Star of Light (1998)
 Ultraman Gaia: The Battle in Hyperspace (1999)
 Ultraman Tiga: The Final Odyssey (2000)
 Ultraman Cosmos: The First Contact (2001)
 Ultraman Cosmos 2: The Blue Planet (2002)
 Ultraman Cosmos vs. Ultraman Justice: The Final Battle (2003)
 Ultraman: The Next (2004)
 Ultraman Mebius & Ultraman Brothers (2006)
 Superior Ultraman 8 Brothers (2008)
 Mega Monster Battle: Ultra Galaxy Legends (2009)
 Ultraman Zero: The Revenge of Belial (2010)
 Ultraman Saga (2012)
 Ultraman Ginga S The Movie (2015)
 Ultraman X The Movie (2016)
 Ultraman Orb The Movie (2017)
 Ultraman Geed The Movie (2018)
 Ultraman R/B The Movie (2019)
 Ultraman Taiga The Movie (2020)
 Ultraman Trigger: Episode Z (2022)
 Shin Ultraman (2022)
 Ultraman Decker Finale: Journey to Beyond (2023)

Specials

 Ultra Q (January 1966–July 1966)
Ultraman Kids' M78 Movie (1984)
Ultraman Kids' Proverb Stories (1986)
Ultraman Kids: 30 Million Light-Years In Search of Mother (1991–1992)
Ultraman vs. Kamen Rider (1993) Co-production with Toei Company and Ishinomori Productions
Ultraseven - Operation: Solar Energy (1994)
Ultraseven - The Ground of the Earthlings (1994)
Ultraman Graffiti (1990)
Ultraman: Super Fighter Legend (1996)
Heisei Ultraseven (1994-2002)
Ultraseven 30th Anniversary Trilogy (1998)
Ultraseven 1999 The Final Chapters Hexalogy (1999)
Ultraseven 35th Anniversary Evolution Pentalogy (2002)
Heisei Ultraman side stories (2001)
Ultraman Tiga Side Story: The Giant Resurrected in the Ancient Past (2001)
Ultraman Dyna: Return of Hanejiro (2001)
Ultraman Gaia: Gaia Again (2001)
 Ultra Q: Dark Fantasy (April 2004–September 2004)
Ultraman Max: Super Battle! (2005)
Ultraman Mebius (2006-2009)
Ultraman Mebius Side Story: Hikari Saga (2006-2007)
Ultraman Mebius Side Story: Armored Darkness (2008)
Ultraman Mebius Side Story: Ghost Reverse (2009)
Ultra Galaxy Legend Side Story: Ultraman Zero vs. Darklops Zero (2010)
 Ultraman Retsuden (2011–2016)
Ultraman Zero Side Story: Killer the Beatstar (2011)
Neo Ultra Q (January 2013–March 2013)
 Ultraman Zero: The Chronicle (January 2017–June 2017)
 Ultraman Orb: The Chronicle (January 2018–June 2018)
 Ultraman New Generation Chronicle (January 2019–June 2019)
 Ultraman Chronicle Zero & Geed (2020)
 Ultraman Chronicle Z: Heroes' Odyssey (2021)
 Ultraman Chronicle D (2022)
 Ultraman New Generation Stars (2023)

Miniseries

 Ultra Fight (1970)
 Ultra Super Legend: Andro Melos (1984)
 Ultra Super Fight (1994)
 Ultraman Zearth: Parody Chapter (1996)
 Ultraman Nice (1999)
 Ultraman Boy's Ultra Coliseum (2003)
 Ultra Zone (2011)
 Ultra Zero Fight (2012)
 Ultra Fight Victory (2015)
 Ultraman Orb: The Origin Saga (2016-2017)
 Ultra Fight Orb (2017)
 Ultra Galaxy Fight
 New Generation Heroes (2019)
 The Absolute Conspiracy (2020-2021)
 The Destined Crossroad (2022-2023)
 Ultraman Regulos (2023)
 Ultraman Regulos: First Mission (2023)

Video games

 Ultraman MSX (1984)
 Ultraman: Kaijuu Teikoku no Gyakushuu Famicom Disk System (1987)
 Ultraman 2 Famicom Disk System (1987)
 Ultraman Club: Chikyuu Dakkan Sakusen Famicom Disk System (1988) 
 Ultraman Club 2: Kaette Kita Ultraman Club Famicom (1990)
 Ultraman Club: Teki Kaijuu o Hakken Seyo Game Boy (1990)
 SD Battle Ozumo: Heisei Hero Basho Famicom (1990)
 SD Hero Soukessen: Taose! Aku no Gundan Famicom (1990)
 SD The Great Battle Super Famicom (1990)
 Battle Dodge Ball Super Famicom (1991)
 Ultraman Club 3: Mata Mata Shiyutsugeki!! Ultra Kyoudai Famicom (1991)
 Ultraman Game Boy (1991) 
 Ultraman Super Famicom (1991)   
 Ultraman Arcade (1991)   
 Ultraman: Towards the Future SNES (1991)
 Ultraman Club: Kaijuu Dai Kessen!! Famicom (1992)
 The Great Battle II: Last Fighter Twin Super Famicom (1992)
 Versus Hero: Road to the King Fight Game Boy (1992) 
 Battle Dodge Ball Game Boy (1992)
 Hero Senki: Project Olympus Super Famicom (1992)
 Battle Soccer: Field no Hasha Super Famicom (1992)
 Great Battle Cyber Famicom (1992)
 Ultraman Club: Tatakae! Ultraman Kyoudai!! Arcade (1992)
 Battle Baseball Famicom (1993)
 The Great Battle III Super Famicom (1993)
 Battle Dodge Ball II Super Famicom (1993)
 Tekkyu Fight! The Great Battle Gaiden Game Boy (1993)
 Ultra Toukon Densetsu Arcade (1993)
 Cult Master: Ultraman ni Miserarete Game Boy (1993)
 Ultraman Sega Mega Drive (1993)
 Ultraman Club: Supokon Fight! Famicom (1993)
 Ultraseven Super Famicom (1993)
 Ultraman Powered Panasonic 3DO (1994)
 Ultraman Chou Toushi Gekiden Game Boy (1994)
 The Great Battle Gaiden 2: Matsuri da Wasshoi Super Famicom (1994)
 Gaia Saver Super Famicom (1994)
 Battle Soccer 2 Super Famicom (1994)
 The Great Battle IV Super Famicom (1994)
 Ultraman Powered: Kaijuu Gekimetsu Sakusen Playdia (1994)
 Ultraseven: Chikyu Boei Sakusen Playdia (1994)
 Ultraman Ball Game Boy (1994)
 Ultra League Super Famicom (1995)
 The Great Battle V Super Famicom (1995)
 Battle Crusher Game Boy (1995)
 Battle Pinball Super Famicom (1995)
 Battle Racers Super Famicom (1995)
 Super Pachinko Taisen Super Famicom (1995)
 Super Pachinko Taisen Game Boy (1995)
 Super Tekkyu Fight! Super Famicom (1995)
 Ultra X Weapons/Ultra Keibitai Arcade (1995)
 Ultraman Hiragana Daisakusen Playdia (1995)
 Ultraman Alphabet TV e Yokoso Playdia (1995)
 PD Ultraman Invader PS1 (1995)
 PD Ultraman Link Sega Saturn (1996)
 Ultraman: Ultra Land Suuji de Asobou Playdia (1996)
 Ultraman: Chinou Up Daisakusen Playdia (1996)
 SD Ultra Battle: Ultraman Densetsu Super Famicom (1996)
 Ultraman Zukan Sega Saturn (1996)
 Ultraman Zearth PS1 (1996)
 Ultraman: Hikari no Kyojin Densetsu Sega Saturn (1996)
 Ultraman Zukan 2 Sega Saturn (1997)
 The Great Battle VI PS1 (1997)
 Battle Formation PS1 (1997)
 Ultraman Fighting Evolution (1998)
 Ultraman Zukan 3 Sega Saturn (1998)
 Ultraman Tiga & Ultraman Dyna: New Generations PS1 (1998)
 PD Ultraman Battle Collection 64 Nintendo 64 (1999)
 Super Hero Operations PS1 (1999)
 Great Battle Pocket Game Boy Color (1999)
 Super Hero Operations: Diedal's Ambition PS1 (2000)
 Kids Station: Bokurato Asobou! Ultraman TV PS1 (2000)
 Kids Station: Ultraman Cosmos PS1 (2001)
 Ultraman Fighting Evolution 2 PS2 (2002)
 Charinko Hero Nintendo GameCube (2003)
 Ultraman PS2 (2004)
 Ultraman Fighting Evolution 3 PS2 (2004)
 Ultraman Fighting Evolution Rebirth PS2 (2005)
 Ultraman Nexus (video game)|Ultraman Nexus PS2 (2005)
 Ultraman Fighting Evolution (series)|Ultraman Fighting Evolution 0 PSP (2006)
 Jissen Pachi-Slot Hisshouhou! Ultraman Club ST PS2 (2006)
 Pachitte Chonmage Tatsujin 12: Pachinko Ultraman PS2 (2007)
 Daikaiju Battle: Ultra Coliseum Nintendo Wii (2008)
 Kaiju Busters Nintendo DS (2009)
 Ultra Coliseum DX: Ultra Senshi Daishuketsu Nintendo Wii (2010)
 Kaiju Busters POWERED Nintendo DS (2011)
 The Great Battle Full Blast PSP (2012)
 Battle Dodge Ball III PSP (2012)
 Lost Heroes Nintendo 3DS, PSP (2012)
 Heroes' VS PSP (2013)
 Ultraman All-Star Chronicle PSP (2013)
 Super Hero Generation PS3, PS Vita (2014)
 Lost Heroes 2 Nintendo 3DS (2015)
 Ultraman Fusion Fight! Arcade (2016)
 City Shrouded in Shadow PS4, PS Vita (2017)
 Ultraman R/B Nintendo Switch (2018)
 Ultra Kaiju Monster Rancher Nintendo Switch (2022)

Books

Comics

Harvey Comics series 
Between 1993 and 1994, Harvey Comics published two comic book series based on the 1966 Ultraman television series.

Dark Horse Comics series 
In 2003, Dark Horse Comics published a comic book based on Ultraman Tiga.

Marvel Comics series 
Since 2020, Marvel Comics started publishing an initial new Ultraman comic book limited series titled The Rise of Ultraman, written by Kyle Higgins & Matt Groom with art by Francesco Manna. It debuted in September 2020 and concluded in January 2021.

A second series titled The Trials of Ultraman premiered in March 2021, with Higgins, Groom and Manna returning and concluded in August of the same year.

A third series titled The Mystery of Ultraseven, which will be written by Higgins and Groom, and drawn by Davide Tinto, David Lopez, and Gurihiru, will be released on August 17, 2022.

During Anime Expo 2022, Groom announced a crossover event between the current Ultraman comics with the Marvel Universe for 2023.

Manga

References

External links
Official website of Tsuburaya Productions 
Ultraman Connection — Official website 
Official Ultraman channel at YouTube

 
Mass media franchises
Bandai brands
Bandai Namco franchises